Andries Bekker (born 5 December 1983 in Cape Town, South Africa) is a South African rugby union player for the Springbok rugby team as well as Kobelco Steelers in the Japanese Top League.

Playing career

Bekker made his South African debut in 2008 against Wales in a 43–17 victory in Bloemfontein.

At 6'11" he is one of the tallest international rugby players, but he only made the Springbok side regularly after the retirement of locks Bakkies Botha and Victor Matfield. He is the son of former Springbok International Hennie Bekker who was also a lock.

Holding the record for being the tallest Springbok in history, Andries Bekker was an imposing figure in the DHL Stormers lineout. Despite his large physique, he is blessed with mobility and pace; aspects which have seen him become an integral part of the current Springbok squad. His experience and all-round ability was to be crucial to the success of a relatively young pack in 2010.

In 2013 Bekker agreed to a move to Japanese club Kobelco Steelers. He announced his retirement in January 2018.

Accolades
Bekker was a Vodacom Super 14 Rugby Player of the Year nominee in 2008.

References

Sources

External links 

itsrugby.co.uk profile

South African rugby union players
South Africa international rugby union players
Stormers players
Western Province (rugby union) players
Kobelco Kobe Steelers players
Living people
Afrikaner people
1983 births
Rugby union players from Cape Town
South African expatriate rugby union players
Expatriate rugby union players in Japan
South African expatriate sportspeople in Japan
Alumni of Paul Roos Gymnasium
Rugby union locks